"Mood Ring" is a song by New Zealand singer-songwriter Lorde. The song was released through Universal Music New Zealand on 18 August 2021, as the third single from her third studio album, Solar Power. "Mood Ring" was written and produced by Lorde and Jack Antonoff.

Background
The track listing for New Zealand singer-songwriter Lorde's third studio album Solar Power was announced on 21 June 2021, with "Mood Ring" as the album's eleventh track. On 16 August 2021, Lorde's website was updated with a mood ring chart. The same day, Lorde announced the release of "Mood Ring" on 18 August 2021, via her website. In a statement, Lorde said the following of "Mood Ring":

Critical reception
Writing for Billboard, Hannah Dailey called the song a "airy, guitar-led track", which "both lightly mocks the promotion of a phony holistic lifestyle and sympathizes with people who find comfort in that same lifestyle". Claire Shaffer of Rolling Stone called "Mood Ring" a "mellow acoustic track with only the faintest hint of percussion", sonically comparing it to the previously-released "Solar Power" and "Stoned at the Nail Salon". In a negative review, Pitchfork described it as "less exciting than hoped for" and said that Lorde's critique of wellness culture seemed "pretty trite for someone who's previously been so ahead of the curve".

Music video
A music video for the song, directed by Lorde and Joel Kefali, was released at 7AM NZDT on 18 August 2021. Claire Shaffer of Rolling Stone described the video as "a continuation of her "Solar Power" visual", where "[Lorde], now with bleached-blonde hair, leads a cult-like ceremony under a sunlit tent, surrounded by her followers in matching jade green outfits". Vulture writer Zoe Haylock stated that the video displays Lorde "using crystals, vitamins, sun salutations, and more to 'get well from the inside.'"

Track listing
Streaming
 "Mood Ring" – 3:45
 "Stoned at the Nail Salon" – 4:26
 "Solar Power" – 3:12

Credits and personnel
Credits adapted from Tidal.

 Lorde – vocals, songwriting, production
 Jack Antonoff – songwriting, production, bass, acoustic guitar, electric 6-string, keyboards, programming
 Matt Chamberlain – drums, programming
 Phoebe Bridgers – background vocals
 Clairo – background vocals
 Lawrence Arabia – background vocals
 Marlon Williams – background vocals
 Mark "Spike" Stent – mixing
 Chris Gehringer – mastering engineer
 Will Quinnell – mastering

Charts

Release history

References

2021 singles
2021 songs
Lorde songs
Song recordings produced by Lorde
Song recordings produced by Jack Antonoff
Songs written by Lorde
Songs written by Jack Antonoff